Myrtle is a small, unincorporated community in Oregon County, Missouri, United States. The community lies on a low ridge above the south side of Mill Creek along Missouri Route V.

Myrtle was laid out in 1878 by Jessie Moore, and named after his daughter Myrtle Moore.  A post office called Myrtle has been in operation since 1884.

Children attend Couch Public School which lies approximately three miles northwest of town along Missouri Route 142.

References

Unincorporated communities in Oregon County, Missouri
Unincorporated communities in Missouri